"Leave a Light On" is a song written by Rick Nowels and Ellen Shipley, produced by Nowels for American rock singer Belinda Carlisle's third solo album, Runaway Horses (1989). Released as a single, it narrowly missed the top 10 in the United States, peaking at number 11. It fared better elsewhere, reaching the top five in several countries, including Australia, Austria, Canada, Ireland, and the United Kingdom. The song's music video was directed by Peter Care.

Overview
Released at the end of 1989 on CD, 7-inch vinyl, and 12-inch vinyl, "Leave a Light On" became a top-ten hit in Australia, Austria, Canada, the Netherlands, Italy,  Sweden, Switzerland, and the United Kingdom. In the United States "Leave a Light On" peaked at number 11, affording Carlisle her final US top-twenty hit.

"Leave a Light On" features George Harrison on slide guitar; Carlisle recalls: "Rick [Nowels] said we should get someone cool and with a distinctive style to play the lead guitar part. I thought for a moment and said 'What about George Harrison?' I had met George briefly a few years earlier in San Remo Italy and Morgan [Mason, Carlisle's husband] through his work on Sex Lies and Videotape" - a film Mason had produced for Harrison's HandMade Films - "knew someone who was close to [Harrison] and able to get word to him. George responded right away, saying he'd love to help out."

There are four versions of the song. The album version and the 7" Edit were mixed by Shelly Yakus and Steve McMillan. The other two, mixed by Jason Corsaro, are the Extended Mix and an edit of this titled the Kamikazee Mix; the latter is included on Carlisle's "Vision of You" CD single.

Critical reception
David Giles from Music Week named "Leave a Light On" a Single of the Week, writing, "No great departure from the formula pop of her earlier singles, with glossy production undercut by a rock edge as though to indicate some serious intent beneath the glossy surface." Richard Lowe from Smash Hits said, "Magnificent. I'm a sucker for thoroughly predictable American rock records with whistleable tunes, chugging guitars, big blustering choruses and words about nothing in particular except for general lovey-doveyness. And so are lots of people, which is why this'll be a giant hit. Quite right too."

Music video
The accompanying music video for "Leave a Light On" was directed by Peter Care.

Track listings
 US and Canadian 7-inch single
 "Leave a Light On" – 4:15
 "Shades of Michaelangelo" – 5:52

 UK CD single
 "Leave a Light On" (7-inch version)
 "Shades of Michaelangelo"
 "Leave a Light On" (extended mix)

 UK 12-inch single
A1. "Leave a Light On" (extended mix)
B1. "Leave a Light On" (7-inch version)
B2. "Shades of Michaelangelo"

Personnel

 Produced by Rick Nowels
 Vocals by Belinda Carlisle
 Slide guitar by George Harrison
 Guitar by Rick Nowels and X.Y. Jones
 Keyboards by Charles Judge

 Twelve string guitar by Ben Schultz
 Bass by John Pierce
 Drums by Rudy Richman
 Background vocals by Ellen Shipley, Maria Vidal, Donna De Lory and Bekka Bramlett

Charts

Weekly charts

Year-end charts

Certifications

Cover versions
Grant & Forsyth (nl) recorded "Leave a Light On" as part of a medley on their 1990 album Country Love Songs.
A eurotrance cover version of the song by Dream Factory featuring Jessica Palmer was released in 2007.
A Hi-NRG version of "Leave a Light On" was recorded in 2013 by Nicki French.
In 2013, retro synthpop producer/remixer Yisraelee produced a cover version of the track.
In 2016, South African four-piece band 4Werke (4Warm) released a cover version on their self-titled album.

Popular culture
The single can be heard in a 1991 episode of the TV sitcom Out of This World entitled "I Want My Evie TV".

References

1989 singles
1989 songs
Belinda Carlisle songs
MCA Records singles
Song recordings produced by Rick Nowels
Songs written by Ellen Shipley
Songs written by Rick Nowels
Virgin Records singles